The 2015–16 Primera División Femenina de Fútbol was the 28th edition of Spain's highest women's football league.

Overview
Barcelona defended the title for the fourth straight season. The competition, running from 6 September 2015 to 12 June 2016, was contested by sixteen teams, with Granadilla making its debut.

Athletic Bilbao became champion on 5 June 2016 after taking advantage of the defeat of Barcelona against Atlético Madrid by 0–1. Previously, Athletic beat Oviedo Moderno, relegated like Collerense, 3–0 at Lezama.

Teams

League table

Results

Season statistics

Top scorers

Best goalkeepers

Hat-tricks

4 Player scored 4 goals

All-season Team

On 27 June 2016, La Liga named for the first time an All-season Team.

Transfers

See also
Royal Spanish Football Federation

References

External links
Primera División (women) at La Liga 
RFEF Official Website 

2015-16
Spa
1
women's